Apostolepis is a genus of snakes in the subfamily Dipsadinae. However, the familial placement differs among sources. It has also been placed in the family Colubridae, subfamily Dipsadinae or Xenodontinae, or in the family Xenodontidae. The genus Apostolepis is endemic to South America.

Species

Nota bene: A binomial authority in parentheses indicates that the species was originally described in a genus other than Apostolepis.

References

Further reading
Boulenger GA (1896). Catalogue of the Snakes in the British Museum (Natural History). Volume III., Containing the Colubridæ (Opisthoglyphæ and Proteroglyphæ) ... London: Trustees of the British Museum (Natural History). (Taylor and Francis, printers). xiv + 727 pp. + Plates I-XXV. (Genus Apostolepis, p. 232).
Cope ED (1862). "On Elapomorphus, Sympholis, and Coniophanes ". Proceedings of the Academy of Natural Sciences of Philadelphia 1861 [13]: 524. (Apostolepis, new genus).
Freiberg MA (1982). Snakes of South America. Hong Kong: T.F.H. Publications. 189 pp. . (Genus Apostolepis, pp. 65, 69, 89).

Apostolepis
Snake genera
Taxa named by Edward Drinker Cope